María Vega Pagán (born October 9, 1977) is a Puerto Rican politician affiliated with the New Progressive Party (PNP). She was a member of the Puerto Rico House of Representatives from 2009 to 2013 representing District 11.

Early years and studies

María Vega Pagán was born in Vega Alta on October 6, 1977. She was raised in the Barrio Bajura Vega Alta.

Vega completed a Bachelor's degree in Political Science from the University of Puerto Rico at Río Piedras.

She studied the Master in Administration from the University Meteopolitana

Professional career

Vega worked as a Social and Family Assistance technician for the Department of Family Affairs of Puerto Rico from 1999 to 2008.

Political career

Vega began her political career in 2008, when she ran for the House of Representatives of Puerto Rico to represent District 11. She was elected at the 2008 general election becoming the first female to win in that district. During her first term, she presided the Commission of Integrated Development of the North Region.

Vega wasn't reelected in 2012.

References

|-

 

Living people
1977 births
Mayors of places in Puerto Rico
New Progressive Party members of the House of Representatives of Puerto Rico
People from Vega Alta, Puerto Rico
University of Puerto Rico alumni